Start Together is compilation box set containing the entire remastered discography of the American rock band Sleater-Kinney. A digital version of the remastered box set was released on September 2, 2014. Three thousand limited edition physical copies of the box set were released on colored vinyl with a 44-page companion book on October 21, 2014. The box set also included a 7″ single of the song "Bury Our Friends" from their 2015 album No Cities to Love.

Critical reception

Jenn Pelly of Pitchfork Media praised the compilation box set, stating that "Start Together tells the unlikely story of how this band carried the wildfire of '90s Oly-punk to pastures of more ambitious musicality—a decade that moves from caterwauling shrieks to glowing lyricism, from barebones snark to Zep-length improv, from personal-political to outright (left) political."

Contents
 Sleater Kinney
 Call the Doctor
 Dig Me Out
 The Hot Rock
 All Hands on the Bad One
 One Beat
 The Woods
 "Bury Our Friends" (single)

Charts

References

External links
Sup Pop press release

2014 compilation albums
Sleater-Kinney compilation albums
Sub Pop compilation albums